Albert Lee Beaty (1869–1936) was a U.S. state legislator in  Ohio. He served in the Ohio House of Representatives. A Republican, he represented Hamilton County, Ohio for two consecutive terms from 1917 to 1920.

References 

People from Hamilton County, Ohio
Members of the Ohio House of Representatives
1869 births
1936 deaths
African-American men in politics